Harvey Griswold Turner (June 7, 1822November 22, 1893) was an American lawyer, politician, and judge.  He served two years in the Wisconsin State Senate, representing Washington County, and five years as county judge of Ozaukee County.  He was also the youngest delegate to Wisconsin's 2nd constitutional convention, which produced the Constitution of Wisconsin in the Winter of 1847–1848.

Biography

Born in East Oswego, New York, Turner received his primary education at Oswego Academy.  He moved to Waukesha, Wisconsin Territory, in 1840, with his parents and siblings, where they were some of the first settlers in the area.  Beginning in 1842, he read law at the law offices of Finch & Lynde in Milwaukee.  He was admitted to the bar in 1844 and quickly moved to set up a legal practice in Grafton, in Washington County.

In 1847, Turner was elected as a delegate to Wisconsin's 2nd constitutional convention.  He was the youngest delegate at the convention, and was assigned to the committee on executive, legislative, and administrative provisions.  Following the referendum which ratified the constitution, Turner was considered a candidate for Wisconsin circuit court judge in the 3rd circuit, but he withdrew after the nomination of Charles H. Larrabee.

In 1850, he was elected as Washington County's representative to the Wisconsin State Senate, running on the Democratic ticket.  In 1853, Ozaukee County was created from the eastern quarter of Washington County and Turner was elected as the first county judge of the new county.  He was subsequently re-elected and served until 1858.

In 1854, the Ozaukee County Democratic Party rejected the renomination of John B. Macy for Congress in Wisconsin's 3rd congressional district, and instead nominated Turner.  Turner consented to the nomination, but came in a distant 3rd in the November general election.

He subsequently moved to Manitowoc, where he formed a law practice in partnership with his son, William.  The partnership ended in 1882, when William moved to Milwaukee.  But the elder Turner subsequently moved to Milwaukee, after the death of his wife, and the two resumed their partnership in 1887.  Harvey Turner retired from the practice just a few months before his death in 1893.

His death was attributed to influenza.

Family
Harvey Turner was a son of Joseph Turner and his wife Mary ( Griswold).  The Turners and Griswolds were both descendants of early and prominent settlers of Connecticut Colony.  The passage of Connecticut's first Blue laws were attributed to an ancestor of the Turner family.  The Griswolds were related to Connecticut governors Matthew and Roger Griswold.

Joseph Turner served in the War of 1812, then brought his family to the new Wisconsin Territory in 1840.  He served in the Territorial Legislature and subsequently served in the Wisconsin State Senate during the 1st State Legislature.  Later he became one of the founders of Menasha, Wisconsin.  Harvey's younger brother, Eugene S. Turner, also served in the Wisconsin Legislature and was a prominent lawyer in Port Washington, Wisconsin.

Harvey Turner married Emeline Griswold Teall, a cousin of his mother.  They had one son, William J. Turner, who also became a prominent lawyer and served as a Wisconsin circuit court judge in Milwaukee County.

Electoral history

U.S. House of Representatives (1854)

| colspan="6" style="text-align:center;background-color: #e9e9e9;"| General Election, November 7, 1854

References

|-

1822 births
1893 deaths
Politicians from Oswego, New York
People from Grafton, Wisconsin
Wisconsin state court judges
Wisconsin state senators
19th-century American politicians
19th-century American judges